The International Potato Center (known as CIP from its Spanish-language name Centro Internacional de la Papa) is a research facility based in Lima, Peru, that seeks to reduce poverty and achieve food security on a sustained basis in developing countries through scientific research and related activities on potato, sweet potato, other root and tuber crops, and on the improved management of natural resources in the Andes and other mountain areas. It was established in 1971 by decree of the Peruvian government.

CIP is one of the 15 specialized research centers of the Consultative Group on International Agricultural Research, an international consortium of agricultural research organizations, having joined in 1972.

In late 2015, they partnered with NASA to attempt to grow potatoes in a simulated Martian environment. In March 2017, they announced that preliminary indications are positive.

CIP - Georgia
In 2015, CIP began a 3-year project to "Enhance the rural livelihood of Georgia", for which in 2017 the Republic of Austria provided funding, delegated to the Austrian Development Agency, which was extended an additional three years. The project's goal is to "improve the livelihoods of Georgian farmers by increasing profitability and sustainability of their potato crops and to increase capacity of national players in the potato seed value chain."

Directors

Richard L. Sawyer - founding Director 1971–1991
Hubert Zandstra - 1991–2004
Pamela K. Anderson - 2004–2013
Barbara Wells - 2014

References

External links
 Official website

International research institutes
Research institutes in Peru
Agricultural research institutes
Potato organizations
Organisations based in Lima
Agriculture in Peru
Vegetable research institutes